Félix Ramananarivo (19 May 1934 – 12 May 2013) was the Roman Catholic bishop of the Diocese of Antsirabe, Madagascar.

Ordained in 1965, Ramananarivo was named bishop in 1994 and retired in 2009.

See also
Catholic Church in Madagascar

References

1934 births
2013 deaths
21st-century Roman Catholic bishops in Madagascar
20th-century Roman Catholic bishops in Madagascar
Malagasy Roman Catholic bishops
Roman Catholic bishops of Antsirabé